German submarine U-406 was a Type VIIC U-boat built for Nazi Germany's Kriegsmarine for service during World War II.
She was laid down on 6 September 1940 by Danziger Werft, Danzig as yard number 107, launched on 16 June 1941 and commissioned on 22 October 1941 under Oberleutnant zur See Horst Dietrichs.

Design
German Type VIIC submarines were preceded by the shorter Type VIIB submarines. U-406 had a displacement of  when at the surface and  while submerged. She had two shafts and two  propellers.

U-406 was fitted with five  torpedo tubes (four fitted at the bow and one at the stern), fourteen torpedoes, one  SK C/35 naval gun, 220 rounds, and a  C/30 anti-aircraft gun. The boat had a complement of between forty-four and sixty.

Service history
The boat's career began with training at 8th U-boat Flotilla on 22 October 1941, followed by active service on 1 May 1942 as part of the 7th Flotilla for the remainder of her service.

During the attack of Convoy ON 92 on May 11 and May 12 1942, U-406 will suffer from torpedo launch failures on two separate occasions thus failing to hit any ship.

Wolfpacks
U-406 took part in eleven wolfpacks, namely:
 Hecht (8 May – 18 June 1942) 
 Blücher (14 – 28 August 1942) 
 Iltis (6 – 23 September 1942) 
 Spitz (22 – 31 December 1942) 
 Neuland (4 – 13 March 1943) 
 Dränger (14 – 20 March 1943) 
 Drossel (29 April – 5 May 1943) 
 Rügen (14 – 26 January 1944) 
 Stürmer (26 January – 3 February 1944) 
 Igel 1 (3 – 17 February 1944) 
 Hai 1 (17 – 18 February 1944)

Fate
U-406 was sunk on 18 February 1944 in the North Atlantic in position , by depth charges from Royal Navy frigate . Twelve of the crew were killed.

Summary of raiding history

Legacy 
U-406 is mentioned in Wolfpack, a song released by the Power metal band Sabaton in their 2005 debut studio album Primo Victoria.

See also
 Convoy ON 154

References

Bibliography

External links

German Type VIIC submarines
1941 ships
U-boats commissioned in 1941
U-boats sunk in 1944
U-boats sunk by depth charges
U-boats sunk by British warships
World War II shipwrecks in the Atlantic Ocean
World War II submarines of Germany
Ships built in Danzig
Maritime incidents in February 1944